George Anthony Hincapie (born June 29, 1973) is an American former racing cyclist, who competed professionally between 1994 and 2012. Hincapie was a key domestique of Lance Armstrong. Hincapie was also a domestique for Alberto Contador in 2007 and for Cadel Evans in 2011, when both men won the Tour de France. He was the owner and general manager of UCI Professional Continental team  until it folded at the end of the 2020 season.

On October 10, 2012, Hincapie released a statement on his website acknowledging the use of performance-enhancing drugs and confirming that he had been approached by US federal investigators and USADA about his experiences with doping. Later that day a statement was released confirming his acceptance of a six-month ban from September 1, 2012, ending on March 1, 2013, along with a stripping of all race results between May 31, 2004, and July 31, 2006.

Hincapie started a record 17 Tours, however, after his doping admission he was retroactively disqualified from the 2004, 2005 and 2006 Tours. The only Tour he started but did not finish was his first. He completed his 16th and final Tour in 2012, which tied Joop Zoetemelk's record of completed Tours. However, following the outcome of the Armstrong investigation, the record reverted to Zoetemelk. He also rode at five consecutive Olympic Games between 1992 and 2008.

Early life
Hincapie was born in Queens, New York, United States. His father Ricardo, a native of Colombia, introduced him to cycling, and his first race training was in New York City's Central Park.  He graduated from Farmingdale High School in Long Island in 1991.

Cycling career
 Hincapie has several important wins of his own, starting with Gent–Wevelgem in 2001 and Kuurne–Brussels–Kuurne in 2005. Also in 2005, Hincapie took two stage wins at the Critérium du Dauphiné and 2nd place at Paris–Roubaix. In 2005 he had his first stage win in the Tour de France where, on July 17, he finished seven seconds ahead of climber Óscar Pereiro to win Stage 15 from Lézat-sur-Lèze to Pla d'Adet. In January 2014, Pereiro acknowledged in a radio show that during the final climb, Hincapie turned his head and said 50,000, which Pereiro assumed was in Euros, although Hincapie was referring to U.S. dollars. Pereiro accepted the offer and sold the stage to Hincapie. The deal was closed some kilometers before arriving to the finish line. More recent victories include two stages at the Tour of California (2006), the overall and a stage at the Tour of Missouri (2007), and another stage win at the Critérium du Dauphiné in 2008. He is a three-time US Professional Road Race champion (1998, 2006, 2009).

Throughout his career Hincapie has targeted the cobbled classics of April, specifically the week that begins with the Tour of Flanders, continues mid-week with Gent–Wevelgem, and ends with Paris–Roubaix.  He achieved his highest position on the podium with his 2001 victory in Gent–Wevelgem.  His 2nd-place finish in the 2005 Paris-Roubaix remains the highest placing in that race by an American.

His many top 10 placings in these races include 3rd, 4th, 5th, 6th (twice), 7th, and 10th in various Tour of Flanders; 3rd, 4th (three times), and 5th in Gent–Wevelgem, in addition to his victory; and 2nd, 4th (twice), 6th (twice), 8th, and 9th in Paris–Roubaix.  While using Three Days of De Panne as a warm-up ride during the previous week, he has placed well in that race also, winning the overall in 2004 and placing third overall in 2002.

In 2005, Hincapie showed a talent for short individual time trials (ITTs), winning the prologue at the 2005 Critérium du Dauphiné Libéré, placing second three times and third once in prologues in 2006 (including at the Tour de France), and placing second in the short ITT at Three Days of De Panne. In the 2006 Paris–Roubaix, bad luck struck Hincapie in the cobbled sector of Mons-en-Pévèle, when the steerer tube of his Trek bicycle snapped, leaving him dangling with no handlebars and crashing heavily. He was near the lead group but had to abandon the race. He later won the ITT at the Eneco Tour of Benelux in 2006 and placed fourth in two longer ITTs that year.  He finished third in the prologue at the 2007 Tour de France and second in the prologue at the Volta a Catalunya in 2008.

He is easily distinguished from the pack by his large size.

He also set a record by completing his 17th Tour of Flanders, surpassing Briek Schotte. On June 11, Hincapie announced that he would retire at the end of the season, after 19 years in the professional peloton. On June 30, Hincapie started a record 17th Tour de France. He was allowed to lead the race onto the Champs-Élysées as this was his final Tour de France. In August, Hincapie announced that he had raced in his last event, the USA Pro Cycling Challenge. In his own words: “It's been a long career for me, a good career and I'm proud of it. I'm sad to leave, but at the same time, I'm excited to spend more time with my family and start a new life.” He also said that he didn't plan to terminate all his relations with cycling. Following his retirement, Hincapie opened a bed and breakfast in Travelers Rest, South Carolina with his brother.

In March, 2017, Hincapie turned to mountain biking and competed in the Masters category at the eight-day Absa Cape Epic stage race in South Africa over 641 km. The race is held in a two-person team format and Hincapie and partner Cadel Evans – reunited after Hincapie helped Evans to win the 2011 Tour de France – won the category.

Doping
On October 10, 2012, Hincapie announced on his website that he had used banned substances at times in his career. The statement reads in part:

The statement came as the U.S. Anti-Doping agency announced plans to release documents related to doping accusations against Lance Armstrong, a former teammate of Hincapie.

Career achievements

Major results

1992
 1st  Team time trial, National Road Championships
1994
 2nd Overall Tour de Luxembourg
1st  Points classification
1st Stages 1 & 4
 4th Classic Haribo
1995
 1st Acht van Chaam
 3rd Reading Classic
 10th Philadelphia International Championship
1997
 5th Reading Classic
1998
 1st  Road race, National Road Championships
 1st Philadelphia International Championship
 2nd Reading Classic
 5th Lancaster Classic
1999
 1st Reading Classic
 1st Stage 6 PruTour
 1st  Points classification, Tour de Luxembourg
 3rd Lancaster Classic
 4th Gent–Wevelgem
 4th Paris–Roubaix
 5th HEW Cyclassics
 9th Milan–San Remo
 9th Philadelphia International Championship
2000
 3rd Reading Classic
 4th Trofeo Luis Puig
 5th Philadelphia International Championship
 6th Paris–Roubaix
 7th Lancaster Classic
 8th Road race, Olympic Games
2001
 1st Gent–Wevelgem
 1st San Francisco Grand Prix
 2nd Lancaster Classic
 3rd Overall Tour de Picardie
 3rd Philadelphia International Championship
 4th Paris–Roubaix
 9th Milan–San Remo
2002
 1st Stage 1 (TTT) Volta Ciclista a Catalunya
 2nd Classic Haribo
 3rd Gent–Wevelgem
 3rd Overall Volta ao Algarve
 4th Tour of Flanders
 5th HEW Cyclassics
 5th Philadelphia International Championship
 6th Paris–Roubaix
 9th Lancaster Classic
2003
 1st Stage 4 (TTT) Tour de France
 7th Overall Tour of Belgium
2004
 1st  Overall Three Days of De Panne
 4th Gent–Wevelgem
 5th Overall Paris–Nice
 8th Paris–Roubaix
 10th Tour of Flanders

2004
 1st Stage 4 (TTT) Tour de France
 3rd San Francisco Grand Prix
 5th Grand Prix Eddy Merckx
2005
 1st Kuurne–Brussels–Kuurne
 1st GP Ouest–France
 Tour de France
1st Stages 4 & 15
 Critérium du Dauphiné Libéré
1st Stages 1 & 7
 2nd Paris–Roubaix
 6th Brabantse Pijl
 7th Tour of Flanders
2006
 3rd Tour of Flanders
 4th Overall Tour of California
1st Stages 2 & 5
 5th Gent–Wevelgem
 8th Overall Tirreno–Adriatico
 Tour de France
Held  after Stages 1–2

2006
 1st  Road race, National Road Championships
 2nd Overall Eneco Tour
1st Stage 4 (ITT)
 9th Clásica de San Sebastián
2007
 1st  Overall Tour of Missouri
1st Stage 2
 2nd Road race, National Road Championships
2008
 1st Stage 2 Critérium du Dauphiné Libéré
 1st Stage 7 Tour of California
 4th Overall Tour of Missouri
 5th Tour of Flanders
 9th Paris–Roubaix
 9th Overall Three Days of De Panne
2009
 1st  Road race, National Road Championships
 8th E3 Prijs Vlaanderen
2010
 4th Gent–Wevelgem
 6th Tour of Flanders
2011
 2nd Road race, National Road Championships
 5th Overall USA Pro Cycling Challenge
1st Stage 2
 6th Tour of Flanders
2017
 1st  Overall Masters Cape Epic (with Cadel Evans)

Grand Tour general classification results timeline

Classics & Monuments results timeline

Personal
He is married to former runway model and Tour de France podium girl Melanie Simonneau, and they have three children, daughter Julia Paris (born on November 3, 2004), son Enzo (born on June 20, 2008), and son Lucca (born on May 16, 2014). Hincapie resides in Greenville, South Carolina.

References

External links

Team Columbia
Hincapie Sportswear
Palmares at Cycling Base (French)
Profile on BMC Cycling Team
Cycling Shorts. Interview with George Hincapie on mentoring young BMC Riders

1973 births
American Tour de France stage winners
American cycling road race champions
American male cyclists
American sportspeople in doping cases
American sportspeople of Colombian descent
Cyclists at the 1992 Summer Olympics
Cyclists at the 1996 Summer Olympics
Cyclists at the 2000 Summer Olympics
Cyclists at the 2004 Summer Olympics
Cyclists at the 2008 Summer Olympics
Doping cases in cycling
Farmingdale High School alumni
Living people
Olympic cyclists of the United States
People from Farmingdale, New York
People from Travelers Rest, South Carolina
Sportspeople from Greenville, South Carolina
Sportspeople from Queens, New York
Cyclists from New York (state)